Clanculus mariaemaris is a species of sea snail, a marine gastropod mollusk in the family Trochidae, the top snails.

Description
The height of the shell attains 5 mm.

Distribution
This species occurs in the Atlantic Ocean off São Tomé and Príncipe.

References

 Rubio F. & Rolan E. (2002)  Revisione del genere Clanculus (Gastropoda: Trochidae) per l'Atlantico orientale / Revision of the genus Clanculus (Gastropoda: Trochidae) in the eastern Atlantic. Roma: Edizioni Evolver. 78 pp.

External links

mariaemaris
Gastropods described in 2002
Invertebrates of São Tomé and Príncipe